The 2017–18 All-Ireland Senior Club Football Championship was the 48th annual gaelic football club championship since its establishment in the 1970–71 season. The winners receive the Andy Merrigan Cup.

Corofin (Galway) won their third All-Ireland, beating Nemo Rangers (Cork) by 2–19 to 0–10 in the final on 17 March 2018.

The defending champions were Dr Crokes from Kerry who defeated Slaughtneil of Derry on 17 March 2017 to win their 2nd title.

Format

County Championships

Ireland's 32 counties play their county championships between their senior gaelic football clubs. Each county decides the format for their county championship. The format can be straight knockout, double-elimination, a league, groups, etc. or a combination.

Only single club teams are allowed to enter the All-Ireland Club championship. If a team which is an amalgamation of two or more clubs or a university team wins a county's championship, a single club team will represent that county in the provincial championship as determined by that county's championship rules (normally it is the club team that exited the championship at the highest stage).

Provincial Championships

Connacht, Leinster, Munster and Ulster each organise a provincial championship for their participating county champions. All matches are knock-out and two ten minute periods of extra time are played if it's a draw at the end of normal time.

All-Ireland

Fulham Irish, the winners of the London club championship, played Corofin, the winners of the Galway provincial championship, in a single match on 21 January 2018. The game was played in London and was referred to as a quarter-final. This was the final year for this arrangement – from 2018 onwards, the London champions played in the Connacht senior club championship.

Two semi-finals were played on two Saturday's in mid-February. The All-Ireland final was played in Croke Park on St. Patrick's Day, the 17th of March.

TV Coverage
TG4 continue to broadcast live and deferred club championship games each year.  Eir Sport also secured rights to broadcast live Gaelic football and hurling club championship games. 2017 was the first time Eir Sport broadcast club championship games and will broadcast up to 30 live games. These games include rounds of county championships as well as county finals and provincial and All-Ireland club championship matches.

County Finals

Connacht County Finals

Galway SFC

Leitrim SFC

Mayo SFC

Roscommon SFC

Sligo SFC

Leinster County Finals

Carlow SFC

Dublin SFC

Kildare SFC

Kilkenny SFC

The Kilkenny SFC champions take part in the Leinster Club Intermediate Football Championship.

Laois SFC

Longford SFC

Louth SFC

Meath SFC

Offaly SFC

Westmeath SFC

Wexford SFC

Wicklow SFC

Munster County Finals

Clare SFC

Cork SFC

Kerry SFC

Limerick SFC

Tipperary SFC

Waterford SFC

Ulster County Finals
Antrim SFC

Armagh SFC

Cavan SFC

Derry SFC

Donegal SFC 

Down SFC

Fermanagh SFC

Monaghan SFC

Tyrone SFC

London Final

London SFC

Provincial championships

Connacht Senior Club Football Championship

Connacht Quarter-Final

Connacht Semi-Finals

Connacht Final

Leinster Senior Club Football Championship

The Kilkenny senior football champions compete in the All-Ireland Intermediate Club Football Championship.

Leinster Preliminary Round

Leinster Quarter-Finals

Leinster Semi-Finals

Leinster Final

Munster Senior Club Football Championship

Munster Quarter-Finals

* Waterford did not complete their club championship in time (due to their county's participation in the All-Ireland hurling final) and therefore were eliminated.

Munster Semi-Finals

Munster Final

Ulster Senior Club Football Championship

Ulster Preliminary Round

Ulster Quarter-Finals

Ulster Semi-Finals

Ulster Final

All-Ireland

All-Ireland Bracket

All-Ireland Quarter-Final

All-Ireland Semi-Finals

All-Ireland final

Championship statistics

Top scorers

Overall

In a single game

2017-18 Club All-Stars

The Club All-Star awards were initiated in 2018.

 Club Team Of The Year

1. Antóin McMullan (Slaughtneil)
2. Liam Silke (Corofin)
3. Kieran Fitzgerald (Corofin)
4. Karl McKaigue (Slaughtneil)
5. James Murray (Moorefield)
6. Chrissy McKaigue (Slaughtneil)
7. Dylan Wall (Corofin)
8. Alan O'Donovan (Nemo Rangers)
9. Michael Farragher (Corofin)
10. Eanna O'Connor (Moorefield)
11. Christopher Bradley (Slaughtneil)
12. Ian Burke (Corofin)
13. Patrick McBrearty (Kilcar)
14. Luke Connolly (Nemo Rangers)
15. Martin Farragher (Corofin)

 Club Footballer Of The Year

Liam Silke (Corofin)

Also nominated - Ian Burke (Corofin), Michael Farragher (Corofin),

References

All-Ireland Senior Club Football Championship
All-Ireland Senior Club Football Championship